Emphyastes is a genus of true weevils in the beetle family Curculionidae. There are at least three described species in Emphyastes.

Species
These three species belong to the genus Emphyastes:
 Emphyastes fucicola Mannerheim, 1852
 Emphyastes fuscicola Mannerheim, 1852
 Emphyastes mannerheimi Egorov & Korotyaev, 1977

References

Further reading

 
 
 

Molytinae
Articles created by Qbugbot